The 1953–54 season in Swedish football, starting August 1953 and ending July 1954:

Honours

Official titles

Notes

References 
Online

 
Seasons in Swedish football